The following protests have taken, or are taking, place in Myanmar:
 1962 Rangoon University protests
 1974 U Thant funeral protests after the death of U Thant
 1988 Burmese anti-government protests associated with the 8888 Uprising
 2007 Myanmar anti-government protests associated with the Saffron Revolution
 2014–2015 Burmese protests in response to the Myanmar National Education Law 2014
 2015 Black Ribbon Movement Myanmar of medical professions and medical students
 2015 Yellow Ribbon Campaign of Myanmar movement of lawyers
 2019 nationwide protests in response to the Naypyidaw Victoria rape case
 2021–2023 Myanmar protests in opposition to the 2021 Myanmar coup d'état
 March 2021 Death of Khant Nyar Hein
 March–April 2021 Kalay clashes
 April 2021 Clash at Thaw Le Hta

Lists of protests
Protests in Myanmar